Fort St. Louis (also known as Fort St. Francois a Canso, Fort Chedabuctou, Fort St. Louis a Chedabuctou) was a French fort built in Chedabucto, Acadia (present day Guysborough, Nova Scotia). The British attacked in 1720 as they built Fort William Augustus at Canso.

Established 
The village of Guysborough was first settled by Europeans in 1634 by Isaac de Razilly. He built a fort named Fort St François à Canso at the entrance to the harbour. In 1655 Nicolas Denys, governor of the new St Lawrence Bay Province, built Fort Chedabuctou on Fort Point to serve as his capital. The fort was later replaced and renamed Fort St Louis.

In 1682, a permanent settlement was started by Clerbaud Bergier. A group cleared land and spent the winter with the first crops being planted in 1683. Louis-Alexandre des Friches de Meneval landed at Chedabouctou in 1687 when arriving to take up his position as governor of Acadia.

Claude Bergier led other merchants from La Rochelle, France in enjoying a fishing monopoly in Acadia. In 1682, Fort St. Louis was established by the Company of Acadia (Compagnie de la Peche Sedentaire) to protect the fishery. The principal ports were at Chedabucto Bay, which accounted for fifty fishers in 1686. Dauphin de Montorgueil was the commandant at Fort Saint-Louis.

Just before the outbreak of King William's War, Gabriel Gautier erected a small fort and fishing establishment (1686). It had two buildings, 60 X 20 feet each, defended by four cannon. There were 150 residents, of whom 80 were fishermen. A detachment of regular troops was eventually stationed at the fort.

Raid on Chedabucto (1688) 
In 1687 there were 150 persons at Chedabouctou, 80 of whom were fishermen. The Company of Acadia suffered heavy losses in 1688, when Chedabouctou was pillaged by New Englanders.

Battle at Chedabucto (1690) 

During King William's War, in 1690, Captain Cyprian Southack proceeded to Chedabucto to take Fort St. Louis which, unlike Port Royal, Nova Scotia, put up a fight before surrendering.  As part of Sir William Phips expedition to destroy the capital of Acadia Port Royal, Phips sent Southack to Chedabacto with 80 men to destroy Fort St. Louis and the surrounding French fishery. Meneval was stationed at the fort with 12 soldiers. They tried to defend the fort for over six hours, until fire bombs burned the fort to the ground. Southack destroyed the enormous amount of 50, 000 crowns of fish.

At the same time, Phips also dispatched Capt. John Alden who raid Cape Sable Island as well as the villages around the Bay of Fundy, particularly Grand Pre and Chignecto.

The Company of Acadia encountered a variety of difficulties on the way to its final disappearance in 1702.

Raid on Chedabucto (1718) - The Squirrel Affair 
Shortly after Southack established himself at Shelburne, Nova Scotia, the Mi'kmaq raided the station and burned it to the ground. In response, from 17–24 September 1718, Captain Cyprian Southack and Captain Thomas Smart led a raid on Canso.  During the eighteenth century, Canso was not on Nova Scotia's mainland, but instead referred to the settlements on modern-day Grassy Island. On 18 September 1718, Smart seized a French brigantine and sloop, along with smaller vessels, as well as each ships' cargo.  He next apprehended the French fishers' cod before destroying their flakes and houses.  When Smart and Southack returned to Boston, they both encouraged Governor of Nova Scotia Richard Philipps to fortify Canso.

See also 
Military history of the Acadians
Military history of Nova Scotia
Military history of the Mi’kmaq people
List of French forts in North America

References 

Texts
 Mark Haynes. The Forgotten Battle: A History of the Acadians of Canso/Chedabuctou
Acadia at the end of the 17th Century, p.205

Military history of Nova Scotia
Military history of Acadia
Military forts in Acadia